The 1969 Illinois Fighting Illini football team was an American football team that represented the University of Illinois during the 1969 Big Ten Conference football season. In their third year under head coach Jim Valek, the Illini compiled a 0–10 record and finished in last place in the Big Ten Conference.

The team's offensive leaders were quarterback Steve Livas with 705 passing yards, running back Dave Jackson with 465 rushing yards, and wide receiver Doug Dieken with 486 receiving yards. Dieken was selected as the team's most valuable player.

Guard Doug Redmann was selected by the Newspaper Enterprise Association as a second-team player on the 1969 College Football All-America Team.

Schedule

References

Illinois
Illinois Fighting Illini football seasons
College football winless seasons
Illinois Fighting Illini football